Yvon Gourbal (Torreilles, 14 August 1939 - Saint-Laurent-de-la-Salanque, 31 October 2004) was a French rugby league player and coach.

Biography 
He played several seasons for XIII Catalan, a rugby league club based in Perpignan, with which he won the Lord Derby Cup in 1959. Thanks to his club performances, he received 4 caps for France between 1960 and 1964 taking part at the 1960 Rugby League World Cup, however, he did not took part at any match due to his military duties as well as not managing to obtain a long-term permit for said tournament.

After his playing career, he embraced a successful coaching career. Under his guidance, XIII Catalan won four French Championships in a row in 1982, 1983, 1984 and 1985, as well as a Lord Derby Cup in 1985. He ended his tenure at XIII Catalan in 1986, but he later coached Le Pontet from March 1987.

Honours

As player 

 Team honours:
 Winner of the Lord Derby Cup in 1959 (XIII Catalan).

Cap details

As coach 

 Team honours
 French Champion in 1982, 1983, 1984 and 1985 (XIII Catalan).
 Winner of the Lord Derby Cup: 1985 (XIII Catalan).
 Runner-up at the French Championship: 1986 (XIII Catalan) and 1987 (Le Pontet).
 Runner-up at the Lord Derby Cup: 1983 (XIII Catalan).

Notes and references

Notes

References

Bibliography

External links
Yvon Gourbal statistics at rugbyleagueproject.com

French rugby league coaches
XIII Catalan players
France national rugby league team players
1939 births
2004 deaths
Sportspeople from Pyrénées-Orientales
French rugby league players
Rugby league locks